Lorenzo Prezzato (1555 – 29 October 1610) was a Roman Catholic prelate who served as Bishop of Chioggia (1601–1610).

Biography
Lorenzo Prezzato was born in Venice, Italy in 1555. On 4 June 1601, Lorenzo Prezzato was appointed during the papacy of Pope Clement VIII as Bishop of Chioggia.
On 12 June 1601, he was consecrated bishop by Girolamo Bernerio, Bishop of Ascoli Piceno, with Aurelio Novarini, Archbishop of Dubrovnik, and Raffaele Inviziati, Bishop of Cefalonia e Zante, serving as co-consecrators. 
He served as Bishop of Chioggia until his death on 29 October 1610.

References

External links and additional sources
 (for Chronology of Bishops) 
 (for Chronology of Bishops) 

17th-century Roman Catholic bishops in the Republic of Venice
Bishops appointed by Pope Clement VIII
1555 births
1610 deaths